Sharjah Fort (Al Hisn Sharjah) is a double story traditional rock, coral and adobe fortification in the centre of the city of Sharjah in the United Arab Emirates (UAE).

The fort was originally constructed in 1820 by the then Ruler of Sharjah, Sheikh Sultan bin Saqr Al Qasimi. It was partially demolished in January 1970, the one remaining tower (called 'kubs', that to the far right of the fort as you stand at the entrance) lending its name to the square in which it sits, 'Al Burj', Arabic for 'tower'.

The fort has been restored by the current Ruler as part of a comprehensive programme of ongoing restoration of the traditional core of the old port city of Sharjah under the name 'Heart of Sharjah'. The restoration of Sharjah Fort commenced in January 1996 and was completed in April 1997.

History 

Early British records of 1830 note Sharjah's fort located, "A little inland, mounting six pieces of cannon, together with some detached towers. In case of alarm from an enemy, it is stockaded round with date trees and wood sufficient for repelling the attack of Arabs although of little service against regular troops."

The demolition of the fort took place in January 1970, when Sheikh Khalid bin Muhammad Al Qasimi wished to remove all trace of Sheikh Saqr bin Sultan Al Qasimi, the previous Ruler. Told of the demolition while studying in Cairo, the current Ruler of Sharjah, Sheikh Sultan bin Muhammad Al-Qasimi rushed home in an attempt to halt the move. Arriving too late to save most of the fort, he nevertheless persuaded his brother to cease the demolition. All that remained was a single tower, the 'Burj'.

Taking notes of the line of the remaining foundation and saving various fittings from the demolition site, Sheikh Sultan was able to restore the fort almost 20 years later with the original doors and windows saved from the demolished fort.

Saqr bin Sultan – the man whose memory the demolition of the fort was intended to erase – returned to Sharjah in 1972 in an abortive coup attempt in which Sheikh Khalid bin Muhammad was killed.

References

Infrastructure completed in 1820
Museums established in 1997
Museums in Sharjah (city)
City museums in the United Arab Emirates
History museums in the United Arab Emirates
National museums of the United Arab Emirates
Forts in the United Arab Emirates
Castles in the United Arab Emirates
History of the Emirate of Sharjah
Buildings and structures completed in 1820
History of the United Arab Emirates